Dorothy H. Rose (September 21, 1920 – July 8, 2005) was an American politician from New York.

Life
She was born Dorothy Zdarsky on September 21, 1920, in Buffalo, New York. She attended East High School. She graduated B.A. from D'Youville College, and B.Sc. in library science from Geneseo State Teachers College. Then, alternatively, she taught English at several high schools and colleges, or worked as a librarian at several libraries. She married Thomas A. Rose (died 1959), a newspaper editor and publisher. She also entered politics as a Democrat.

Dorothy H. Rose was a member of the New York State Assembly from 1965 to 1968, sitting in the 175th, 176th and 177th New York State Legislatures.

She died on July 8, 2005, in Mercy Hospital in Buffalo, New York, after a stroke.

Sources

1920 births
2005 deaths
Politicians from Buffalo, New York
Democratic Party members of the New York State Assembly
Women state legislators in New York (state)
State University of New York at Geneseo alumni
D'Youville College alumni
20th-century American politicians
20th-century American women politicians
21st-century American women